Gorna Malina is a village in western Bulgaria, part of Sofia Province. It is the administrative centre of Gorna Malina municipality, which lies in the central eastern part of Sofia Province, 20-30 kilometres east of Sofia. The village is located between the western Balkan Mountains to the north and the Sredna Gora range to the south.

Municipality
Gorna Malina municipality covers an area of 336 square kilometres and includes the following 14 places:

Gallery

Honour
Malina Cove on Low Island in the South Shetland Islands, Antarctica is named after Gorna Malina.

External links

 Gorna Malina municipality website 

Villages in Sofia Province